José Genaro Kingo Nonaka, born Kingo Nonaka (野中 金吾 Nonaka Kingo), was a Mexican combat medic during the Mexican Revolution and later became the first documentary photographer of Tijuana.

Early life
Nonaka was born in Fukuoka Prefecture, Kyushu in 1889. In Japan he worked in the field and as a pearl diver. He emigrated to Mexico at age 17, accompanied by an older brother and uncle. They settled in Oaxaca on a coffee plantation. After tiring of the harsh work, Nonaka embarked on a three-month journey to the United States. In Chihuahua, he was taken in by a local family who eventually adopted him and had him baptized. Later, he learned nursing from a nearby hospital and acquired a license to work at the infirmary.

Military career

In March 1911, Nonaka was visiting another Japanese immigrant when the Battle of Casas Grandes broke out. Nonaka treated the wounded Francisco I. Madero and was subsequently recruited into Madero’s army. Nonaka would later become nursing chief of the civil hospital in Ciudad Juárez, where he was in charge of attending wounded soldiers.

He participated in 14 combat operations during the Revolution: two with the forces of Francisco I. Madero and 12 with the Northern Division commanded by Francisco Villa.

He attained the rank of captain in the Batallón de Sanidad de la División del Norte. In September 1967, he was awarded an order of merit for his service by Secretary of Defense Marcelino García Barragán.

Later life
Between 1921 and 1942, he was settled in Baja California. He fell in love with a Mexican nurse named Petra García Ortega and married her. They ended up having five children. He opened two photo studios in Tijuana and became a naturalized citizen in 1924. During this era, Nonaka's photography showed a different side of the Tijuana area, which up to that point was focused on tourism. Focusing on cultural, civic, and sports events and on the changes Tijuana underwent, from small town to a larger city. He donated more than 300 photos of early Tijuana to the Archivo Histórico y la Sociedad de Historia de Tijuana.

As a result of World War II tensions, Nonaka and other Japanese Mexicans living in northwest Mexico were forced to move to Mexico City on orders from President Lázaro Cárdenas. He was a founding member of the Instituto Nacional de Cardiología. He died in 1977 and is interred in the Panteón Jardín, Mexico City.

See also
 Japanese community of Mexico City

References

1889 births
1977 deaths
People of the Mexican Revolution
Japanese emigrants to Mexico
Naturalized citizens of Mexico
People from Fukuoka Prefecture
People from Tijuana
Combat medics
Mexican photographers
Mexican people of Japanese descent